Walton Rural Life Center is an agricultural charter elementary school in Walton, Kansas, United States, and operated by Newton USD 373 public school district. During the 2015–2016 school year, there were 210 students at Walton Rural Life Center. They teach students from kindergarten to 4th grade, and there are two classes for each grade.

History
Walton Public Schools provided elementary, junior high, and high school education for decades before it merged with Newton USD 373 public school district.

In 2006, the Walton Elementary School was converted into the Walton Rural Life Center charter school.

Academics
Walton Rural Life Center is one out of two charter schools that is agriculture based, the other one being a school in Ohio.  Walton Rural Life Center also teaches its students about math, science, agriculture, reducing, reusing, and composting.

Walton Rural Life Center was the first public elementary school in the United States to add agriculture to its curriculum. The teachers design projects based on subjects that interest the students. Math, science, and agriculture are the main concepts studied. Instead of reading from a textbook, students experience hands-on learning. The school has farm animals and Kindergarten through fourth graders take turns doing chores and feeding the animals. For example, the students gather eggs, clean them, and check them for cracks. When this is all done, they sell the eggs and decide what to do with the money they earned. The school also has a greenhouse where the students grow flowers, plants, and vegetables.

Film
Using Agriculture to Spur Achievement : The Walton 21st Century Rural Life Center, 2011, U.S. Department of Education filmed a documentary at the Walton 21st Century Rural Life Center charter elementary school in November 2010.  The crew also interviewed farm families, teachers, students, and community members. The resulting video will be featured on their website, highlighting the center as a best practices model of innovation in education.

References

External links
 
 USD 373, school district for Newton, North Newton, Walton
 USD 373 School District Boundary Map, KDOT

Articles
 Walton school's growing pains - Hutchinson News - February 12, 2017
 Murky future: Walton school - The Kansan - February 2, 2017
 Editorial: Walton needs a little love - The Kansan -January 28, 2017

Schools in Harvey County, Kansas
Public elementary schools in Kansas